Sarah April Louise Baxter (born 25 November 1959) is a British journalist. From 2013 to 2020, she was the deputy editor of The Sunday Times.

Early life
Baxter was born on 25 November 1959 in London, England. She is the daughter of an American mother, and has dual citizenship.

Baxter was educated in the US and France, and in the UK at Ashford School, a co-educational independent school in the town of Ashford in Kent and North London Collegiate School, a girls' independent day school in the district of Edgware in north London. She studied modern history at St Hilda's College, Oxford, graduating in 1981.

After leaving university, Baxter worked for Penguin Books as a copywriter and then Virago Press as a press officer.

Career
Following a period as an editor for the London edition of Time Out, she joined the New Statesman where she became the political editor. She then joined The Observer where she eventually became senior associate editor responsible for the comment section. Baxter left The Observer in 1996.

Baxter moved to The Sunday Times following an appointment as editor of the News Review section, a post in which she remained for four years. From July 2001, Baxter was based in New York. She became the Washington correspondent of The Sunday Times  in 2005, before returning to London in 2009 to become editor of the newspaper's magazine, which she edited until September 2015. In June 2013, she was appointed the deputy editor of The Sunday Times and has served as a non-executive director of Times Newspapers Holdings Ltd. She stepped down as deputy editor of The Sunday Times in 2020.

Personal life
Sarah Baxter's husband, Jez Coulson, is a British photographer; the couple have two children.

References

1959 births
Living people
Alumni of St Hilda's College, Oxford
British women journalists
British magazine editors
The Observer people
The Sunday Times people
People educated at Christleton High School
20th-century British journalists
21st-century British journalists
British people of American descent